Maicel Uibo (born 27 December 1992) is an Estonian decathlete. While competing for the University of Georgia, he won the 2014 and 2015 NCAA championships in decathlon. Uibo won the silver medal at the 2019 World Championships, setting his personal best in the event with 8604 points.

International competitions

Personal life
Uibo married his college sweetheart, Bahamian track star and two-time Olympic 400 meter champion, Shaunae Miller in 2017.

References

External links

All-athletics profile
Sport195 profile

1992 births
Living people
Estonian decathletes
People from Põlva
World Athletics Championships athletes for Estonia
World Athletics Championships medalists
Athletes (track and field) at the 2016 Summer Olympics
Olympic athletes of Estonia
Estonian expatriate sportspeople in the United States
Georgia Bulldogs track and field athletes
Athletes (track and field) at the 2020 Summer Olympics